Fugaku Wind Cave is a lava tube at the northern foot of Mount Fuji, Japan. It is the largest of the several lava tubes that are found in the Aokigahara forest in Fujikawaguchiko Town, Yamanashi Prefecture.

Aokigahara Forest
The 864 A.D. eruption of Mount Fuji brought huge lava flows, creating Lake Shōji and Lake Sai of the Fuji Five Lakes by dividing Se-no-umi into two, several cinder cones such as Ōmuro and Nagao mountains, and a large flat area now called the Aokigahara Forest. In this forest can be found several lava tubes, including:
 Narusawa Ice Cave, in Narusawa Village, Yamanashi Prefecture
 Fugaku Wind Cave, in Fujikawaguchiko Town, Yamanashi Pref.
Lake Sai Bat Cave, in Fujikawaguchiko Town, Yamanashi Prefecture

All three were declared as Natural Monuments of Japan in 1929.

Fugaku Wind Cave
Fugaku Wind Cave, 201 meters long with an average height of 8.7 meters, is found in the Aokigahara area. It is so named from Fugaku (富岳), a literary name for Mount Fuji (富士山), and Fūketsu (風穴) for wind cave, because there is enough circulation of air on the cave. The walls of the cave are mostly made of basalt.

Inside the cave, there are icicles even in summer, lava terraces and rope-like lava forms. From the Edo period to the Meiji period (ca. 1600 to 1900) this cave was used to keep the eggs of silk worms.

Fugaku Wind Cave along with Narusawa Ice Cave nearby is managed by Fuji Sightseeing Industry Co. of Fuji Express Group (富士急グループ). The souvenir shop at the entrance was renovated recently and opened in 2012, as "Wood Station Wind Cave".

Transportation
Fugaku Wind Cave can be accessed from Japan National Route 139 on the south side (on Mt. Fuji side).

See also
Narusawa Ice Cave
Lake Sai Bat Cave

Gallery

References

External links
 Fugaku Wind Cave (The Sightseeing Net of Yamanashi, "the Country of Mt. Fuji") (in Japanese)

Caves of Japan
Tourist attractions in Yamanashi Prefecture
Geography of Yamanashi Prefecture
Lava tubes
Natural monuments of Japan
Mount Fuji